Rónán, anglicised as Ronan, is a given name and surname of people and fictional characters.

Ronan may also refer to:

Ronan (album), by Ronan Keating, 2000
"Ronan" (song), by Taylor Swift, 2012
Ronan, Montana, a city in the United States
Ronan (footballer, born 1994), Brazilian footballer Ronan Queiroz de Paula Afonso
Ronan (footballer, born 1995), Brazilian footballer Ronan David Jerônimo